Thurlby could be

Thurlby, South Kesteven, Lincolnshire, England
Thurlby, North Kesteven, Lincolnshire
Thurlby, East Lindsey, Lincolnshire